Lily Bumster (10 August 1886 – 13 December 1916), Lily Bumster from November 1913, was a woman from Swansea, Wales.

Early life
Lily Bumster was born on 10 August 1886 in Swansea. Her parents were William Bumster, a local stonemason, and Margaret Bumster née Webb, a servant in an eating house in Cross Street, Swansea; the family lived in Madoc Street, Swansea. Lily was the second of the Bumster' six children. 

The young Lily Bumster grew up in an environment in which drunkenness, crime and violence was commonplace.

Marriage and death
In 1913 she married Michael John Bumster. The relationship was to be brief, as less than a year later her husband enlisted in the army on the outbreak of the First World War. Lily Bumster, by this time suffering severe tuberculosis, died in late 1916.

See also 

Contagious Diseases Acts
Inebriates Act 1898

Notes

References

Bibliography

Welsh female prostitutes
People from Swansea
20th-century Welsh criminals
1886 births
1916 deaths